Hans Bertil Mattias Gardell (born 10 August 1959) is a Swedish historian and scholar of comparative religion. He is the current holder of the Nathan Söderblom Chair of Comparative Religion at Uppsala University, Sweden. He was the first Lenin Award laureate in 2009, and received The Royal Swedish Academy of Letters, History and Antiquities Award for Distinguished Research in the Humanities, the Royal Gold Medal, in 2003.

Career
Mattias Gardell was born in Solna, Stockholm County, Sweden. He earned a PhD in the history of religions at Stockholm University in 1995 and became a docent in 1999. He has been working at the Department of Comparative Religion and the Centre for Research in International Migration and Ethnic Relations at Stockholm University. He has also lived and studied in Cairo, Egypt. In March 2006 he was appointed the first holder (from 1 July 2006) of the Nathan Söderblom Chair of Comparative Religion at Uppsala University.

Gardell specializes in the study of religious extremism and religious racism in the United States, studying groups such as the Ku Klux Klan, the Nation of Islam, and folkish movements in Neopaganism (Odinism). His 1995 dissertation on Louis Farrakhan and the Nation of Islam was published in both British and American editions.

As an expert on Islamophobia, he testified as an expert witness in the trial of Anders Behring Breivik and co-authored the "Sweden"-section of the European Islamophobia Report 2017 published by Turkish think-tank SETA.

Political views

Gardell is a libertarian socialist and a known human rights defender. In the past he considered himself pagan and has called himself a "spiritual anarchist".

Ship to Gaza 
Gardell was one of eleven Swedish activists from Ship to Gaza participating in the flotilla that tried to break the Israeli embargo of the Gaza strip. Along with his wife, Gardell was aboard MV Mavi Marmara during the Israeli armed forces raid on the flotilla on the morning of 31 May 2010. He was deported from Israel and landed in Sweden on 3 June along with his wife and other Swedish participants. He told Swedish journalists "We were victims of a massive military assault ... It can not be described as anything but piracy." He also stated that the soldiers came on board with fully loaded weapons equipped with laser sights and at least four people were killed execution style.

Islamic terrorism 
Gardell has the view that individuals who commit acts of Islamic terrorism for Al-Qaeda and the Islamic State have "no previous contacts with Islam" and "have no connections to any mosque" but instead have radicalized online. Gardell holds the view that the jihadist 2017 Stockholm truck attack has received disproportionate media attention compared to right-wing acts of violence.

Personal life
Gardell is the son of Bertil Gardell, a professor in social psychology, and the brother of writer and comedian Jonas Gardell. He is married to Edda Manga. He has nine children, Linus, Emma, Moa, Ida, Sofia, Stefan, Kim, Amanda, and Ina.

He has said that he feels an attachment to Asatru and has practiced it "in waves", but as of 2007 did not practice it actively.

Bibliography 
  (dissertation)
 
 
 
 
 
 
 Raskrigaren. Seriemördaren Peter Mangs. 2015. Leopard förlag. Swedish. .

References

External links 
 Mattias Gardell page att Uppsala University https://katalog.uu.se/profile/?id=N96-202

1959 births
Living people
People from Solna Municipality
Stockholm University alumni
Academic staff of Uppsala University
Swedish historians of religion
Swedish anarchists
Swedish socialists
Researchers of new religious movements and cults
Pagan studies scholars
Scholars of Islamophobia
Academics and writers on far-right extremism
People deported from Israel
Swedish modern pagans
Modern pagan writers
Libertarian socialists
Swedish anti-fascists
Adherents of Germanic neopaganism